Mark Haskins (born 17 April 1981) is a South African retired footballer who last played as midfielder for SuperSport United F.C. on loan from Bidvest Wits in the Premier Soccer League.

References

External links

1981 births
Living people
Soccer players from Johannesburg
Cape Coloureds
South African soccer players
Florida Atlantic Owls men's soccer players
Jomo Cosmos F.C. players
Moroka Swallows F.C. players
Bidvest Wits F.C. players
SuperSport United F.C. players
Association football midfielders
South African Premier Division players